The Philippine Tackle Football League (PTFL), formerly known as ArenaBall Philippines (ABP), was an American football league in the Philippines. The last champions were the Wolves which won their second title and the Bandits held the most titles, winning four seasons.

History

Season 1
The league was inaugurated on December 12, 2009, by Bernardo “Dodi” A. Palma at the University of Santo Tomas Field. In April 2010, the first official game of the league's first season was played at the Marikina Sports Complex. The inaugural season was contested by four teams; the Bandits, Barracudas, Juggernauts and the Wolves.  The first season started initially with a 7-on-7 format utilizing 3 offensive linemen on offense.

The first champions of the league were the Bandits. The Bandits' running back and team captain, Will Yeh, was named MVP of the first season.

Season 2
In season two, the league switched to a 9-on-9 format.  The Barracudas disbanded and were replaced by The Rebels.  The Bandits won its second championship beating the Juggernauts at the ArenaBowl 14–6. The Juggernauts' quarterback Paul Reyes was named MVP of the 2011 season.

Season 3
By season 3, the league had moved onto the standard 11-on-11 format.  The Bandits and Juggernaut once met again at the championships in season 3 with the Bandits taking their third consecutive league championships scoring 25–8. The MVP of the 2012 season once again came from the Juggernauts, Johnny Babaran who plays as a running back.

Season 4
The Bandits also won the 2013–14 season, again by beating the Juggernauts; 14–6.

Season 5
In season 5, the Vanguards joined the league and the Wolves became the first team other than the Bandits to win the championship, which the former won over the later with the score 16–0. The Wolves' wide receiver, Ivan Klaric was named MVP of the 2014–15 season.

Season 6
Matches of Season 6 took place at the PhilSports Complex. The Tigers and Renegades were the new two teams to join the league. The league has also been rebranded as the Philippine Tackle Football League (PTFL). The PTFL also has managed to strike a deal with Asian Television Content Corp. to air its games at IBC 13. The Tigers withdrew midseason.

By early December 2015, it was reported that all five teams of the league withdrew following a dispute regarding a canceled game and the financing of the league. A game was canceled reportedly following a $250 payment to Bernardo “Dodi” Palma, President of the league. The players of the teams were also reportedly the one who pays the expenses of the league despite sponsorship funds received by the league.

The five teams decided to hold two canceled games and the championships outside the league's auspices.

Manila Wolves defeated the Manila Bandits at the final championship held at the Acacia field in Manila in December 2015 under the banner "Super Bowl I".

The league folded in December 2015. It was succeeded by the Philippine-American Football League which was organized in 2016.

Teams
Bandits (Season 1–6)
Barracudas (Season 1)
Juggernauts (Season 1–5)
Knights
Rebels (Season 2–5)
Renegades (Season 6)
Wolves
Vanguards (Season 5–6)

League winners and runners-up

See also
American Tackle Football Federation of the Philippines
Philippine–American Football League
Philippines national American football team

References

External links
PFTL Official Website
Official Website as ArenaBall Philippines

Sports leagues established in 2009
2009 establishments in the Philippines
2015 disestablishments in the Philippines
Defunct American football leagues
American football in the Philippines
Sports leagues disestablished in 2015